Harold Solomon was the defending champion but lost in the semifinals to Eddie Dibbs.

Jimmy Connors won in the final 6–3, 5–7, 6–1 against Dibbs.

Seeds
A champion seed is indicated in bold text while text in italics indicates the round in which that seed was eliminated.

Draw

Finals

Top half

Section 1

Section 2

Bottom half

Section 3

Section 4

External links
 1980 Volvo International draw 

Singles